Malonyltransferase can refer to:

 (acyl-carrier-protein) S-malonyltransferase
 Anthocyanin 5-O-glucoside 6'''-O-malonyltransferase